945 Barcelona is a minor planet orbiting the Sun in the Asteroid belt. It was discovered 3 February 1921 from Barcelona by the Catalan astronomer Josep Comas i Solà (1868–1937) and named for the city of Barcelona (Spain), the birthplace of the discoverer. It has an estimated diameter of 25.5 km.

This object is the namesake of a Barcelona family of approximately 300 stony asteroids that share similar spectral properties and orbital elements; hence they may have arisen from the same collisional event. All members have a relatively high orbital inclination.

References

External links 
 
 

000945
Discoveries by Josep Comas Solà
Named minor planets
000945
000945
19210203